Leen Yasin Mohammad Al-Btoush (born 20 July 2001)) is a Jordanian footballer who plays as a forward for the Jordan national team.

Her recent matches and career summary.

References

External links
 
 
 Leen Al-Btoush at the Jordan Football Association

2001 births
Living people
Jordanian women's footballers
Jordan women's international footballers
Women's association football forwards
Sportspeople from Amman
Jordan Women's Football League players